Vladislav Bykanov (born 19 November 1989) is an Israeli Olympic short track speed skater. He won the gold medal in the 3,000m at the 2015 and 2018 European Championships. He competed for Israel at the 2014 Winter Olympics.  He also competed for Israel at the 2018 Winter Olympics in Short Track Speed Skating in Pyeongchang, South Korea. He competed for Israel at the 2022 Winter Olympics.

Early and personal life
Bykanov was born in Lviv, Ukraine, and is Jewish. He moved to Israel in 1994 and has lived there ever since. Bykanov lives in the northern Israeli city of Kiryat Shmona, and in Heerenveen, the Netherlands. He studied Economics and Management at Open University of Israel. His nickname is Vlad.

Skating career
His coach is Jeroen Otter. Bykanov started skating when he was eight years old, in Northern Israel. In 2007, Bykanov broke an ankle and missed three months. In 2011 he again broke an ankle and missed four months. In 2015 he had hip surgery and was out for eight months; in 2016 he had another hip operation.

Bykanov qualified to compete for Israel at the 2014 Winter Olympics in Sochi, Russia, in all three individual races. By doing so, he became the first male athlete to qualify from Israel in short track speed skating.	He was Israel's flag bearer at the opening ceremony.   He came in 19th in the 500m, 24th in the 1,000m, and 25th in the 1,500m.

He had his best showing in the 500m in a World Championship in the 2014 World Championship in Montreal, coming in 13th. Bykanov had his other best World Championship showings in the 2016 World Championship in Seoul, coming in 13th in the 1,000m, 15th in the 1,500m, and 15th overall.

Bykanov became the first Israeli short track skater to finish in the top three at the European Championships when he won the gold medal in the 3,000m super final in 2015 in Dordrecht, Netherlands, with a time of 5 minutes 2.882 seconds, ahead of Thibaut Fauconnet of France. At the 2017 European Championships, he won a bronze medal in the 1,500m.

At the January 2018 European Championships in Dresden, Germany, Bykanov won the gold medal in the 3,000m, the silver medal in the Overall competition, and the bronze medal in the 1,500m. He also came in 5th in the 500m, and 21st in the 1,000m.

Bykanov competed for Israel at the 2018 Winter Olympics in Short Track Speed Skating in Pyeongchang, South Korea.

He will compete for Israel at the 2022 Winter Olympics.

Personal records

References

External links
 
 
 

1989 births
Living people
Israeli male short track speed skaters
Olympic short track speed skaters of Israel
Short track speed skaters at the 2014 Winter Olympics
Short track speed skaters at the 2018 Winter Olympics
Short track speed skaters at the 2022 Winter Olympics
Jewish Ukrainian sportspeople
Jewish Israeli sportspeople
Ukrainian male speed skaters
People from Kiryat Shmona
Sportspeople from Lviv
Ukrainian emigrants to Israel
Open University of Israel alumni